Si County or Sixian is a county in northeast Anhui Province, China. It borders the northern part of Jiangsu Province to the north and east and is under the administration of the prefecture-level city of Suzhou.

Name
Si County is named for the Si River and preserves the name of the earlier Si Prefecture and Subprefecture which administered the area during the imperial period, sometimes from Si County and sometimes from nearby areas in what is now Jiangsu.

Administrative divisions
In the present, Si County has 12 towns and 3 townships.
12 Towns

3 Townships
 Dalukou
 Dayang
 Wafang

Climate

References

County-level divisions of Anhui
Suzhou, Anhui